Irfan (also transliterated as Erfan) is an Arabic/Persian male given name, meaning "knowledge", "awareness" and "learning".

Given name

Irfan
 Irfan Khan (born 1982), Pakistani singer 
 Irfan Ahmed (born 1989), Pakistani cricketer
 Irfan Bachdim (born 1988), Indonesian footballer
 İrfan Başaran (born 1989), Turkish footballer
 Irfan Habib (born 1931), Indian Marxist historian of ancient and medieval India
 Irfan Husain, Pakistani writer and journalist 
 Irfan Khan (actor), Indian actor
 Irfan Khoosat, Pakistani actor, producer and comedian
 Irfan Ljubijankić, Bosnian doctor and surgeon, classical music composer, politician and diplomat
 Irfan Makki, Canadian Muslim singer, songwriter of Pakistani origin
 Irfan Mensur (born Irfan Kurić, 1952), Bosnian theatre, television and film actor
 Irfan Orga, Turkish fighter pilot, staff officer and author
 Irfan Pardesi, Pakistani Entrepreneur, Investor and Politician
 Irfan Pathan, Indian cricketer
 Irfan Shahid, American orientalist
 Irfan Smajlagić (born 1961), Croatian handball player 
 Irfan Talib (born 1986), Pakistani cricketer
 Irfan Toker, Turkish judoka
 Irfan Yusuf (born 1969), Pakistani-Australian author

Erfan 
 Erfan Ali, Qatari basketball player
 Erfan Hajrasuliha, Iranian rapper and producer
 Erfan Nasajpour, Iranian-Canadian basketball player
 Erfan Zamani (1999–2022), Iranian killed during the Mahsa Amini protests
 Erfan Zeneli, Finnish footballer

Middle name
Mohammad Irfan Ali, Indian singer
Mohd Irfan Fazail (born 1991), Malaysian footballer

Surname

Irfan
Kareem Irfan, American Islamic community leader
Mohammed Irfan (Guantanamo detainee 101) (born  1979)
Mohammed Irfan (Guantanamo detainee 1006) (born 1982) 
Mohammad Irfan (born 1982), Pakistani cricketer

See also
Irfan (disambiguation)

References

Arabic-language surnames
Arabic masculine given names
Iranian masculine given names
Turkish masculine given names